Michael Ignaz Mildorfer (1690–1747) was an Austrian painter.

Biography
Mildorfer was born in Innsbruck, and later trained his son Josef Ignaz Mildorfer to become a painter as well. Mildorfer painted primarily religious themed works.

References

18th-century Austrian painters
18th-century Austrian male artists
Austrian male painters
1690 births
1747 deaths
Artists from Innsbruck